Malleostemon pedunculatus is a plant species of the family Myrtaceae endemic to Western Australia.

It blooms between August and October producing pink-white flowers.

It is found on sandplains in the Gascoyne region of Western Australia near Shark Bay where it grows in sandy soils.

References

pedunculatus
Flora of Western Australia
Plants described in 1983